c

Atmanirbhar Bharat, which translates to 'self-reliant India', is a phrase the Prime Minister of India Narendra Modi and his government used and popularised in relation to the country's economic development plans. The phrase is an umbrella concept for the Modi government's plans for India to play a larger role in the world economy, and for it to become more efficient, competitive and resilient.

Modi has used the English phrase since 2014 in relation to national security, poverty and digital India. The first popular use of the phrase in Hindi was Atmanirbhar Bharat Abhiyan (Self-Reliant India Mission) during the announcement of India's COVID–19-pandemic-related economic package in 2020. Since then, the phrase has been used by the Ministry of Consumer Affairs, Food and Public Distribution, the Ministry of Education and the Ministry of Defence in press releases, statements and policies. The government has also used the phrase in relation to India's new National Education Policy and the 2021 Union Budget of India. The concept under Modi's premiership has been adapted from earlier uses of the phrase in the Indian sub-continent.

The swadeshi movement was one of India's most successful pre-independence movements. The concept of self-reliance has been used by the country's former Planning Commission in multiple five-year plans between 1947 and 2014. Commentators have noted India has been enacting policies and building institutions that promote self-reliance since its independence. Private companies and their products have been considered as examples of self-reliance in sectors such as beverages, automotives, cooperatives, financial services and banking, pharmaceuticals and  biotechnology.

History

Political self-reliance and self-rule 

India saw a promotion of political self-reliance for swaraj (self-governance or self-rule) during the  independence movement. Activists such as Mahatma Gandhi and Rabindranath Tagore explained self-reliance in terms of the nation and of the self. This included the discipline of an individual and the values of a society. With the foundation of educational institutes such as Visva-Bharati University, Tagore had a role in bringing India closer to self-reliance in education. M. S. Swaminathan said in his youth is the 1930s, he like his peers, "young and old shared the dream of a free and self-reliant India. Purna swaraj (total freedom) and swadeshi (self-reliance) were our goals ..."

In 2022, Union Home Minister Amit Shah acknowledged slogans such as "atmanirbharta", "Make in India" and "vocal for local" were adapted from Gandhi's efforts towards swadeshi. Pre-independence aspirations that had been forgotten are now being revived and adapted, and are being put into practice.

Economic self-reliance and dependence 
The swadeshi movement  was one of the Indian sub-continents most effective pre-independence movements. It was successfully implemented after the partition of Bengal in 1905.

Indian nationalists emphasised economic self-reliance, of which planning was an important part, in the years before independence. The National Planning Committee of the Indian National Congress (INC) was formed in 1938 under its president Subhash Chandra Bose. The committee was multi-disciplinary and composed of well-known personalities from across the sub-continent. Bose lent his full support to the planning efforts to make independent India an economic unit that was industrialised and self-sufficient. There was, however, much opposition to these plans, including non-cooperation by Gandhi, who opposed the type of industrialisation being championed and he called the committee's efforts pointless. Another pre-independence effort to plan the economic development of independent India was the Bombay Plan, whose authors include J. R. D. Tata, G. D. Birla and A. Dalal. The Bombay Plan sought to make India self-sufficient by increasing the role of the state in all aspects of the economy, a contrast to 21st-century India. In the following years, India took cues from economic models in the Soviet Union, later becoming aware of other models such as those of South Korea, Taiwan and Brazil.

Independent India's first major policy document, the Industrial Policy Resolution of 1948, echoed the "national consensus"  regarding how India was to proceed. This national consensus called for a mixed economy and self-reliance. Under Prime Minister Lal Bahadur Shastri, India's Green Revolution and White Revolution (Operation Flood) helped India to become self-sufficient and a world leader in agricultural products such as milk and tea.

In 1983. Sanjaya Baru wrote self-reliance can be understood as "the strategy and the perception of our relative merits and constraints, of our opportunities and of our tasks. Even where deviations had occurred from this strategy they were viewed as temporary departures, as products of expediency, as being forced on an unwilling government ...". He based this on a 1982 lecture at Sydenham College in which economist Ashok Mitra had said; "We opted for self-reliance because, in our view, it was the most rational economic course". Foreign capital at the time was considered a form of colonial dependence, which was undesirable. India had the capability and infrastructure that were necessary for economic development. Following India's decision to take International Monetary Fund (IMF) loans in the 1980s and taking into account the general economic situation in the country, Baru concluded; "it would seem altogether inappropriate to refer to 'self-reliance' any longer as constituting a national goal".

In the 1990s, Prime Minister P. V. Narasimha Rao redefined and adapted the meaning of self-reliance for the country compared with the Nehru era. In October 2005, Prime Minister Manmohan Singh said self-reliance is not simply a policy of autarky or isolating the country; worldwide relationships, interdependence and negotiating power are associated features.

Private companies and their products such as the Maruti 800 car, Thums Up beverage, Amul, HDFC, and pharmaceutical companies Bharat Biotech and Serum Institute of India, have been considered examples of self-reliance in India. In sectors such as food production, India is self-sufficient but problems such as poor nutrition and hunger remain.

Policy and Five-Year Plans 
The Planning Commission of India's lead document, its twelve Five Year Plans, were published from 1951 to 2014 and contained some form of self-reliance or self-sufficiency as a goal. The first two plans formed the basis of self-sufficiency and self-reliance in government policy, which was to be implemented through concepts such as import substitution. This did not achieve adequate progress so the plans shifted to having a larger emphasis on promoting self-reliance. According to the plans, India should have enough money to buy what it needed; by June 1991, however, India had only sufficient foreign exchange reserves for two weeks. These situations and practices such those during Licence Raj led to renewed calls for self-reliance. Bimal Jalan, who became a Reserve Bank of India (RBI)  governor, said the outlook towards self-reliance swung between plans, which were influenced by factors outside India. He said self-reliance must be accompanied by improvements in other economic indicators.

In an address to the National Development Council in 1976, Prime Minister Indira Gandhi, spoke of "self-reliance in food and energy" and "economic self-reliance". The fifth Five-Year Plan of India (1974–1978) has self-reliance was one of the three stated objectives, the other two being related to GDP and poverty. Use also included the achievement of "self-reliance in terms of technology, production and conservation" in relation to non-renewable resources. The report noted in sectors such as industrial machinery and chemicals, the ratio of imports had decreased, an indication of increased self-reliance.

Increase in self-reliance in oil production, in atomic energy capabilities, space technologies, and agricultural and medical research were highlighted retrospectively in the seventh plan. In prospect, self-reliance was a strategic necessity to make India capable of surviving external shocks. "Excessive reliance" was used in the Tenth Five-Year Plan (2002-2007), which also stated "Science and Technology ... plays a lead role in contributing ... self-reliance." The next plan mentioned a "desire for attaining and sustaining self-reliance in some sectors of the economy".

Defence sector 

According to a statement by Prime Minister Atal Bihari Vajpayee in Parliament on 27 May 1998, following nuclear tests on 11 and 13 May:

India's principles governing its defence production have changed; self-sufficiency was followed by self-reliance, which in turn brought about an emphasis on public-private co-production and independent, private production. In 1992, a Self Reliance Review Committee was formed under A.P.J. Abdul Kalam, the scientific advisor to the Defence Minister. The committee created the self-reliance index to identify the degree of content that was made in India as a part of procurement. The ten-year target to increase self-reliance in defence was never achieved. This index did not take into account factors like critical components and sanctions during a conflict. In 2000, K. Subrahmanyam of India's National Security Advisory Board emphasised the need to distinguish self-reliance from self-sufficiency in the defence sector. He said most pragmatic way for India would be self-reliance rather than self-sufficiency. This would lead to challenges such as the reliance and integrity of the supplier.

, over half of India's military equipment is either Soviet or Russian. The defence sector also required self-sufficiency in military logistics, including food during emergencies.

Ministry of Defence (MoD) is going to amend Defence Acquisition Procedure (DAP) 2020. Under the new rules, private sector will be allowed to form joint venture with public sector undertakings in India by acquiring 51% stake. The private sector will also be allowed to export 25% of the production to third countries. Indian Armed Forces also given assurance that they will purchase the end product. Indian Multi Role Helicopter is the first major project to follow this process.

Atmanirbhar Bharat 
During the coronavirus pandemic in India, the lockdown, and an existing slowdown in the growth of the domestic economy and the economic impact of the pandemic, the government issued an adapted idea of self-reliance. On 12 May 2020, Prime Minister Modi publicly used the Hindi phrase for the first time when he said; (trans.) "the state of the world today teaches us that (Atma Nirbhar Bharat) 'Self-reliant India' is the only path. It is said in our scriptures—EshahPanthah. That is—self-sufficient India." While the speech was in Hindi, the reference by Press Information Bureau to both "self-reliance" and "self-sufficiency" caused some confusion. In the days following Modi's speech, the Indian government  issued an economic package called the Atmanirbhar Bharat Abhiyan. It was met with a mixed response.

According to economist Swaminathan Aiyar, "atmanirbhar" can be translated as both self-reliance and self-sufficiency. In the 1960s and 1970s, India's drive for self-sufficiency was unsuccessful, and doing the same again is not advisable. Sadanand Dhume was sceptical of the terminology and language related to the phrase, and whether it meant a revival of pre-liberalisation era policies. Aatmanirbharta or Self-Reliance was the Oxford Hindi Word of Year in 2020.

The adapted plan for self-reliance or aatmarnibharta that emerged included a readiness to associate with and challenge the global economy, unlike past decades where there had been a wish to disassociate, such as during the pre-independence swadeshi movement and with post-independence foreign aid. Swadeshi, however, has been adapted with slogans such as "vocal for local" while at the same time, global interconnectedness is being promoted. The government aims to reconcile this; according to Economist Intelligence Unit; "Modi's policy aims to reduce domestic market access to imports, but at the same time open the economy and export to the rest of the world".

Along with the coronavirus pandemic, Atmanirbhar Bharat Abhiyan could be seen in the context of India-China border relations and India's economic dependence on China in some sectors. Calls for India to boycott Chinese products and promote an Atmanirbhar Bharat instead are practically difficult in the short term for India, which imports US$75 billion worth of goods every year from China, and parts of Indian industry are dependent on China. Following the Galwan Valley skirmish on 15 June 2020, which resulted in a number of deaths, Swadeshi Jagaran Manch, an affiliate of the Rashtriya Swayamsevak Sangh, said if the government was serious about making India self-reliant, Chinese companies should not be given contracts for projects such as the Delhi–Meerut Regional Rapid Transit System.

While an Atmanirbhar Bharat has been extensively promoted during the premiership of Narendra Modi, especially in rhetoric and speeches, this is not always apparent in government policies. There has been concern Atmanirbhar Bharat is political messaging that has no economic impact. India's trade deficit restricts a reduction in dependence on imports, restricting protectionism and isolationism. Protectionist tendencies such as tariff increases, however, have been seen during this phase. The general trend by the Modi government has been to support domestic industries rather than global ones. Subsidies are being used as incentives to get global business leaders into India. The initiative has been accused of crony capitalism and of giving false hope to small businesses that align with the messaging. On 7 December 2021, the Chief Minister of Madhya Pradesh said for India to be self-reliant, states must be self-reliant.

Use by the Modi government

Prime Minister Modi used the phrase "self-reliance" in June 2014 in relation to defence manufacturing for self-reliance in national security. He reiterated this over the years; in 2018, he spoke of the need for India to make its own weapons. In August 2014, he connected self-reliance to Digital India, in September 2014 in reference to making the poor self-reliant, and in March 2022 in relation to technologies.

Proponents of Atmanirbhar Bharat, including Modi and his cabinet ministers for finance and law, have said this self-reliance policy does not aim to be protectionist, exclusionist or isolationist. For India, self-reliance means being a larger and more important part of the world economy. The concept requires policies that are efficient and resilient, and encourage equity and competitiveness. It means being self-sustaining and self-generating; and creating "wealth and values not only for ourselves but for the larger humanity". In March 2021, Finance Minister Nirmala Sitharaman said the Atmanirbhar Bharat campaign is not about bringing back socialism or import substitution, rather the intent is to boost manufacturing. The five pillars of Atmanirbhar Bharat are economy, infrastructure, technology-driven systems, vibrant demography and demand.

COVID-19 pandemic initiatives 

The research, development and manufacture of COVID-19 vaccinations in India was connected in separate statements to atmanirbharta by the President, Vice-President, Prime Minister, and other Union ministers. Modi stated; "Made in India vaccines are a symbol of Atmanirbhar Bharat".

On 12 May, 12 October and 12 November 2020, the government announced a total of three Atmanirbhar Bharat packages worth  in relation to the COVID-19 pandemic in India. The second and third economic stimulus packages were labelled Atmanirbhar Bharat Abhiyan 2.0 and 3.0. As part of the Atmanirbhar Bharat packages, the government decided to change the definition of Small and medium-sized enterprises (MSMEs), boosting scope for private participation in several sectors, increasing FDI in the defence sector; and the changes found support in many sectors such as solar energy manufacturering.

The growth of India's personal protective equipment (PPE) sector from limited production before March 2020 to 4,50,000 pieces a day by the beginning of July 2020, is considered an example of a self-reliant India. The PPE industry in India became a  industry in three months, the second largest after China.

In July 2020 the Ministry of Consumer Affairs, Food and Public Distribution issued a statement placing food rationing within the ambit of Atmanirbhar Bharat. In August 2020, following the migrant workers crisis during the pandemic, the same ministry made a statement placing the welfare of migrants within the concept's ambit.

Other initiatives 

The importance of education and research for self-reliance has been recognised. In an address to the students of Visva-Bharati University, the new National Education Policy of India was connected to the creation of an Atmanirbhar Bharat, and Prime Minister Modi challenged the students to make the villages surrounding the university self-reliant. The Indian Minister of Education has also stressed the link between education and Atmanirbhar Bharat. Educationist and university administrator C. Raj Kumar said the vision of an 'Atmanirbhar University' combines the vision of John Henry Newman's work "Idea of a University" with the Humboldtian model of higher education. Apex public education bodies such as AICTE have asked universities to use Indian books where possible in an effort to promote Atmanirbhar Bharat. The home minister acknowledged the new policy also gives due importance to svabhasha, Indian languages.

During a speech in 2017, Prime Minister Modi said his government was trying to tap human capital flight, and had the aim of engaging India's diaspora. Dependence in the pharmaceutical sector upon active pharmaceutical ingredients is being addressed; out of 53 raw materials that were imported, 35 were being produced in India by March 2022.

In August 2020, Defence Minister Rajnath Singh announced the Defence Ministry was "now ready for a big push to Atmanirbhar Bharat initiative" by imposing import prohibitions on 101 military items in a staged manner over five years. In the following months, more positive indigenisation lists and negative import lists were released. New legislation was portrayed as initiatives towards increasing India's self-reliance. A new category of procurement, Indian Indigenously Designed, Developed and Manufactured (Indian-IDDM) was created. Reform of the Ordnance Factory Board and giving the new defence PSU units large-scale orders was a move towards military self-reliance. Equipment manufactured under Indian-IDDM have been handed over to the military. In the fiscal year 2022, the Ministry of Defense decided to spend 65% of its capital budget on domestic procurement. Increased self-reliance is also being seen in the construction of its warships and submarines.

The phrase was also connected to the 2021, and 2022 Union budgets. Targets for self-reliance in fertiliser production by 2023 have been announced. Government-backed events to provide for the implementation and promotion of self-reliance, and associated slogans such as 'vocal for local' have materialised in the form of the country's first national toy fair, which was digitally launched in February 2021, and the associated brainstorming event Toycathon. In July 2020, the government launched the Atmanirbhar Bharat App Innovation Challenge to encourage the building of apps. 6,940 entries were received, of which 24 apps were chosen as winners, including mapping apps, fact-checking apps and cricket games. The challenge's success led to its continuation through another round of entry submission. Government schemes also support the implementation of self-reliant initiatives.

Slogans 
Slogans initiated under Atmanirbhar Bharat include "vocal for local", '"local for global", "make for world" and "brain drain to brain gain".

Vocal for local 

Products should be "made in India" and promoted to make them competitive. During the Independence Day speech in 2020, Prime Minister Modi said; "The mindset of free India should be 'vocal for local'. We should appreciate our local products, if we don't do this then our products will not get the opportunity to do better and will not get encouraged." Amul managing director RS Sodhi said the phrase vocal for local "meant that products be made competitive vis-a-vis global brands" and that "it didn't mean that one must only buy products that have a logo 'made in India' on it". An extension of this slogan is 'local for global', meaning locally made Indian products should have global appeal and reach. The slogan has  been extended to sectors such as the toy manufacturing; "time to be vocal for local toys".

Make for the world 

Prime Minister Modi, during the 2020 Independence speech, said "make for world" should go together with 'make in India' and that the slogan "make for world" should be a key slogan like 'make in India' is. A variation of the slogan is "Make in India for the world". Arvind Panagariya, the first vice-chairperson of NITI Aayog, said in an interview with Govindraj Ethiraj implementation of the slogan is a matter of optics and policy change.

Indian diaspora 
Non-resident Indians and Overseas Citizens of India are an important part of the global nature of India's self-reliance. According to the government's messaging, Indians who live abroad are part of India's "brain gain" rather than a liability for India. The global nature of India's self reliance has "concern for the whole world's happiness, cooperation and peace".

Domestic commentary 
In the context of India, the concept "self-reliance" was first defined during the Nehru era. The concept of self-reliance has twice been re-defined; the first occurred during the prime-minister-ship of P. V. Narasimha Rao, and the second was during that of Modi. Author Romesh Thapar wrote in 1968; "Self-reliance demands the courage, the guts, to sacrifice something for the future. If no one does, there will be only one new export our current efforts will yield—brain and talent." In June 2020, India's Finance Minister Nirmala Sitharaman said; "At least don't buy Ganesha idols from China".

Atmanirbhar Bharat has been called a re-packaged version or revival of the Make in India movement using new slogans such as "Vocal for Local". Opposition members have spoken about India enacting policies and building companies since its creation to make the nation self-reliant—Steel Authority of India (SAIL) for steel production, IIT for domestic engineers, All India Institutes of Medical Sciences (AIIMS) for medical science, Defence Research and Development Organisation for defence research, Hindustan Aeronautics Limited (HAL) for aviation, Indian Space Research Organisation (ISRO) for space research, Central Coalfields (CCL), NTPC and GAIL in the area of energy; criticising the advertising tactics. Some have re-phrased it as "Fend For Yourself" campaign; it has also been called "economic nationalism". It has been noted the phrase has been used so extensively that it has become "India's overarching national policy ... for growth and development". Unfinished reforms in the atmanirbhar Bharat agenda span from government reform to urban reform to civil service reform.

Arvind Panagariya has criticised policies of self-sufficiency and protectionism as opposed to free trade in the context of India's past.

International reactions 

By mid-2021 a number of global policy experts and those in the Indian diaspora acknowledged Atmanirbhar Bharat is a good initiative while acknowledging doubts the initiative still carries. I June 2021, Vinai Thummalapally, former US ambassador to Belize, said India's global exports of manufacturing products is low and that through this program, competitive, valuable products would lead to export-led growth. Nisha Desai Biswal, an American businesswoman, has said the lack of clarity on the definition of Atmanirbhar Bharat has resulted in a "pause" and that the program could be counter-productive. Freddy Svane, Denmark's ambassador to India, and Himanshu Gulati, Member of Parliament Norway, have both stated Denmark and Norway can help India in its self-reliant mission in the area of energy-efficient technologies.

In June 2021, the UK India Business Council conducted a survey that found a majority of companies found Atmanirbhar Bharat an opportunity to increase business in India. In January 2021 Kenneth Juster, the US ambassador to India, said Atmanirbhar Bharat and the desire to play a larger economic role in the world may not be compatible. In April 2022, the United States Trade Representative wrote in a report of foreign trade barriers India "continues to promote programs such as 'Make in India' (2014) and 'Self-Reliant India' (Atmanirbhar Bharat – May 2020) that seek to increase India's self-sufficiency by promoting domestic industry and reducing reliance on foreign suppliers and imported goods".

In July 2020, the Chief Executive of Lockheed Martin India stated the company is "committed to supporting the Prime Minister Narendra Modi's vision of self-reliance".

See also 

 Swadeshi movement
 Make in India
 Autarky
 Human capital flight
 Import substitution industrialisation
 Strategic autonomy
 Non-alignment and India

References and notes 
Notes

Citations

Bibliography

Further reading

Speeches

Books

Journals

News
 

 
 PTI (2 June 2020). PM Modi Calls On India Inc. To Build An 'Atmanirbhar Bharat'. Bloomberg Quint.
 Jagran (2 June 2020). PM Modi presents 5-I formula for 'Aatma Nirbhar Bharat', says 'we will definitely get our growth back'. Jagran English.
 Ajoy Kumar (31 May 2020). Atmanirbhar Bharat and A Clueless Government. Outlook India.

Think-tanks

External links 

 Ministry of Finance (13/05/2020 to 17/05/2020). Aatmanirbhar Bharat Abhiyaan Part 1 to Part 5 (Part-1: Businesses including MSMEs, Part-2: Poor, including migrants and farmers, Part-3: Agriculture, Part-4: New Horizons of Growth, Part-5:  Government Reforms and Enablers)
AatmaNirbhar Bharat Abhiyan. MyGov.in

2020 in India
Modi administration initiatives
Self-sustainability
Indian political slogans